Barry Morgan may refer to:
Bari Morgan (born 1980), Welsh footballer
Barry Morgan (bishop) (born 1947), Welsh archbishop
Barry Morgan (character), eponymous character in Barry Morgan's World of Organs
Barry Morgan (musician) (1944–2007), English drummer for Blue Mink and owner of Morgan Studios
Barry Morgan (Neighbours), fictional character on the Australian soap opera, Neighbours